Sarow is a municipality in the Mecklenburgische Seenplatte district, in Mecklenburg-Vorpommern, Germany.

It is subdivided in the four villages of Ganschendorf, Gehmkow, Sarow and Törpin.

References